John White Kimball was an American soldier and politician who served as Massachusetts Auditor. He was born in Fitchburg, Massachusetts on February 27, 1828, to Alpheus Kimball, (1792–1859) and Harriet Stone, (1790–1888). Before the American Civil War, Kimball was a scythe manufacturer.

American Civil War service
Kimball served as lieutenant colonel of the 15th Massachusetts Volunteer Infantry and colonel of the 53rd Massachusetts Volunteer Infantry. He was mustered out of the United States Volunteers on September 2, 1863. On December 3, 1867, President Andrew Johnson nominated Kimball for the award of the honorary grade of brevet brigadier general, United States Volunteers, to rank from March 13, 1865, for gallant and distinguished services in the field during the war, The U.S. Senate confirmed the award on February 14, 1868.

Massachusetts state auditor
Kimball was Massachusetts State Auditor between 1891 and 1901. After the war, he was also United States Pension Agent, postmaster and a legislator.

Death
Kimball died on July 15, 1910 at Fitchburg, Massachusetts.

See also

 1872 Massachusetts legislature
List of American Civil War brevet generals (Union)
List of Massachusetts generals in the American Civil War

Footnotes

References

Further reading
 Bridgman, A.A.:., A Souvenir of Massachusetts legislators Vol. VI (1897).
 Crane, Ellery Bicknell:  Historic Homes and Institutions and Genealogical and Personal Memoirs of Worcester County, Massachusetts, with a History of Worcester Society of Antiquity: With a History of Worcester Society of Antiquity Pages 11–12, (1907).
 Ford, Andrew Elmer.: [https://books.google.com/books?id=IhxCAAAAIAAJ&pg=PA3&dq=John+w+Kimball+15th+Massachusetts+Volunteer+Infantry&as_brr=3#PPA1,M1 The Story of the Fifteenth Regiment Massachusetts Volunteer Infantry in the Civil War], 1861-1864 (1898).
 Higginson, Thomas Wentworth.: Massachusetts in the Army and Navy During the War of 1861-65, p. 296 (1896).
 Lt. Col. John W Kimball's Official Report of September 20, 1862, on the Battle of Antietam Creek

Biography
Biography.

 

1828 births
State auditors of Massachusetts
Republican Party members of the Massachusetts House of Representatives
Politicians from Fitchburg, Massachusetts
People of Massachusetts in the American Civil War
Union Army colonels
1910 deaths
19th-century American politicians